Homeland Learning Centres (HLC) are primary and secondary educational facilities in remote Aboriginal communities in the Northern Territory of Australia, sometimes referred to as homelands or outstations. HLCs are operated by the Northern Territory Department of Education instead of schools. They do not have full-time qualified teachers for their students.  there were 29 HLCs in the Northern Territory.

History
In the 1970s and 1980s, some Aboriginal families in the Northern Territory left larger communities (which had been based around church missions) to move back to their traditional lands, a movement known as the Homelands movement. The very remote communities they created are usually referred to as "homelands" or "outstations". When faced with the difficulties of providing education in these Indigenous communities, the Northern Territory Government created Homeland Learning Centres (HLCs). Most are in very remote locations and some are often not accessible by road during the wet season. The NT Government built HLCs for Indigenous students in very remote communities while building schools for non-Indigenous students. According to the Education Department's Annual Report 2001–2002, "All Homeland Learning Centre students are assumed to be Indigenous".

More than 70 HLCs were constructed, the most recent at Emu Point in 2005-2006. Three were operated by the Catholic Education Office. The majority of HLCs are in East and West Arnhem Land (for HLC locations see the List of Homeland Learning Centres). The number of HLCs operational each year may vary, as some homelands are not always populated. The number of HLCs was gradually declining as some closed and others were upgraded to schools. In 2008, the NT Government announced that two HLCs - Alparra and Baniyala (Yilpara) - would be upgraded to schools. 

Year  Number of HLCs
1998    54
1999    54
2000    55
2001    50
2002    54
2003    55
2004    53
2005    53
2006    51
2007    46
2008    45
2009    46
2010    45
2012    39

In May 2009, the NT government issued a policy statement on outstations/homelands, in which it stated: "Government will continue to provide support to larger outstations/homelands and homeland clusters through schools, homeland learning centres and residential models".

Current situation
In July 2017, the NT government invested  to be used over the following three financial years "for refurbishment and upgrade of homeland learning centres to improve the educational experience and learning for students". In 2017–2018, building improvements were completed at Gangan Homeland, and works began in the Yirrkala region at Garrthalala, Dhalinybuy and Wandawuy.

 there were 29 HLCs in the Northern Territory. Works had been completed at Raymingirr, Mungkarta, Donydji HLCs, and an initial stage of work completed at Gochan Jiny-Jirra in the previous financial year.

Characteristics
Homeland Learning Centres (HLCs) are not schools - they are not classified as schools by the Northern Territory government or by the Australian Federal Government, and differ from schools in three respects:

 Physical facilities
 Staffing and administration
 Curriculum

Physical Facilities
HLCs were built at low cost, without electricity or flush toilets. Most were single classrooms, and some were built as shelters with roofs and walls but without windows or doors. By the mid 2000s, many had been upgraded to electricity supplied by generators, but most still did not have ablution facilities such as handbasins, hot water, or flush toilets. Accommodation was not provided for teachers.

Staffing and administration

HLC establishment and operation is based on the number of school-age students in a remote community, although there is often significant variation in actual implementation. 

School age was considered to be from four to seventeen years. Twelve school age children entitles a community to an HLC; if the number drops below nine the HLC is closed. HLCs are entitled to one non-qualified "Assistant Teacher" for each 17 students, and a visiting (non-resident) qualified teacher for every 22 students.

HLCs do not have their own principal. They are the responsibility of a school principal who is in charge of a "hub" school in a larger community. Yirrkala Homelands School, however, has no hub school - its principal is responsible only for several HLCs in East Arnhem.

Qualified teachers visit HLCs from one to four days each week. Visiting qualified teachers are not present at HLCs for the full school day, due to time spent travelling to and from the HLC. In 2009 the NT Department of Education stated they plan to 'increase teaching by qualified teachers up to 5 or 6 hours per day in a virtual or face to face context'.

HLCs are staffed by Indigenous Assistant Teachers. Assistant Teachers do not have teaching qualifications recognised by the Northern Territory Teacher Registration Board, or by other Teacher Registration Boards in Australia. Some Assistant Teachers have little or no English literacy or numeracy.

Curriculum
Until 2003, Indigenous students of secondary school age at HLCs did not receive a secondary education - "HLCs offer a primary education only - i.e. no preschool or secondary". From 2003 secondary age students at some HLCs followed the "post-primary" curriculum used in remote Indigenous schools. In the post-primary curriculum mainstream, secondary subjects including humanities (such as history) and science (such as biology and physics) were either not included or were only superficially studied. Mathematics and English were rudimentary. The Program Book used in 2005 in some HLCs included:

"Secondary English:
Where Do We Want Secondary Students to Get To?
Speaking
 Construct own simple sentences
 Use some contractions, e.g. I'm, you're
 Give some basic personal information on request using learnt formulae e.g. My name is...
Reading
 Sequence a story by arranging pictures in order.
 Shows awareness of some common acronyms e.g. TV, VCR, DVD, etc...
Writing
 Use simple connectives e.g. but, then, and"
"Secondary Mathematics:
Where Do We Want Secondary Students To Get To?
 Recall or work out mentally, multiplication facts including 2x, 5x and 10x.
 Use digital and analogue clocks and calendars
 recognise, describe, draw and make a range of 2D shapes and 3D objects."

Students at Homeland Learning Centres (HLCs) have the lowest English literacy and numeracy in Australia. NAPLAN(introduced in 2008) is Australia's national primary and secondary literacy and numeracy testing program. The NAPLAN results for 2008–2009 confirmed earlier state- and territory-based testing that show Northern Territory remote Indigenous students fail to meet Australian literacy and numeracy standards. NAPLAN data showed that literacy and numeracy failure rates in very remote Northern Territory schools and HLCs approach 100%. Independent literacy testing in October 2007 showed that of 29 students aged 5 to 17 in one Homeland, none were beyond Year 1 (age 6) level.

University of Melbourne partnership
The University of Melbourne's Graduate School of Education has partnered with Yirrkala Homelands School and the local public school at Yirrkala since 2011, a program by which pre-service teachers can complete a two- or four-week, self-funded placement. Some return to teach at remote schools. By November 2018, more than 60 student teachers had participated in placements in rural and remote settings, including North East Arnhem Land, and of these, 18 graduates returned to teach in NT schools.

References

Further reading
 (Progress report – Indigenous Education Review Implementation.)

 (At Yirrkala HLC.)
 On Galiwin'ku (Elcho Island).

External links
 Includes Annual reports since 2013/4.

Aboriginal schools in the Northern Territory
Indigenous Australians in the Northern Territory
Education in Australia